Sleepless is the sixth extended play recorded by American electronic music duo Breathe Carolina. It was released on September 16, 2016 through Spinnin' Records. The EP debuted at No. 4 on the Dance/Electronic Albums chart selling 2,000 copies first week.

Background and composition
Sleepless showcases the group with a new direction of their sound with some roots of their early "emo" sounding vocals according to member David Schmitt. Speaking about the process of putting the EP together, Schmitt said, "the process was a bit different as we worked with so many different artist. In the dance world it’s special because collaborating and sharing ideas isn’t as rare as say a 'rock or warped' type of world so it was different and a lot of fun." The EP features a melodically driven sound, taking advantage of current dance music trends to deliver mainstream friendly productions.

Singles
"More Than Ever" was released as the first single from the EP on November 20, 2015. The duo collaborated with Ryos on the song. "See the Sky" was released as the second single from the EP on July 22, 2016. "Stable" was released on August 26, 2016 as the third single.

Track listing

Personnel
Credits for Sleepless adapted from AllMusic.

Breathe Carolina
 Tommy Cooperman – composer, producer
 Luis Bonet – composer
 David Schmitt – composer, producer

Production
 Kyle F. Anderson – producer
 Dan Book – composer
 Jamie Corbishley – producer
 Siem Henskens	– producer
 Kara Madden – composer
 Renze Michels – producer
 Shane Muller – producer
 James Piros – producer
 Anthony Riggi – producer
 Elizabeth Russo – composer
 Ryos – producer
 Brandon Sammons – composer
 Bob Sandee – producer
 Matthew Steeper – composer
 Sophie Stern – producer
 Kelly Melissa Sweet – composer
 Phillip Wessels – producer

Charts

Release history

References

2016 EPs